Hypocrita dejanira is a moth of the family Erebidae. It was described by Herbert Druce in 1895. It is found in Brazil.

References

 

Hypocrita
Moths described in 1895